Country Club Hills may refer to:

 Country Club Hills, Illinois
 Country Club Hills, Missouri
 A neighborhood in Raleigh, North Carolina
 A neighborhood in Arlington County, Virginia